Cool Boarders 3 is a snowboarding video game developed by Idol Minds for the PlayStation.

Gameplay
Continuing with the previous games in the series, Cool Boarders 3 gives the player the chance to snowboard down mountain courses while completing tricks to amass points. Some courses like Downhill, Boarder X, and Slalom, require the player to concentrate more on beating their CPU opponents' times to the finish line, while others, namely Slope Style, Half Pipe, and Big Air, force the player to pull off many big tricks in order to build up a large point score. A feature absent from the game which was present in its immediate predecessor is support for the System Link feature, removing the ability for non-split screen, two-player multiplayer.

Boarders and boards
Unlike the previous games in the series, Cool Boarders 3 featured a vast number of playable characters, along with unlockable characters. At the start of the game, there are 13 different boarders with the chance to unlock 8 extra boarders upon beating the high scores.

Cool Boarders 3 also included 11 different snowboards and a further 12 unlockable boards each modeled after real boards from snowboard companies such as Burton and Ride.

Reception

The game received above-average reviews according to the review aggregation website GameRankings. In Japan, where the game was ported and published by UEP Systems on November 26, 1998, Famitsu gave it a score of 30 out of 40.

References

External links
 

1998 video games
Deck Nine games
Multiplayer and single-player video games
PlayStation (console) games
PlayStation (console)-only games
Snowboarding video games
Video game sequels
Video games developed in the United States
UEP Systems games